The English Armada, also known as the Counter Armada, was an attack fleet sent against Spain by Queen Elizabeth I of England that sailed on April 28, 1589, during the undeclared Anglo-Spanish War (1585–1604) and the Eighty Years' War under Sir Francis Drake and Sir John Norris with three tasks:
 Destroy the battered Spanish Atlantic fleet, which was being repaired in ports of northern Spain
 Make a landing at Lisbon, Portugal and raise a revolt there against King Philip II (Philip I of Portugal) installing the pretender Dom António, Prior of Crato to the Portuguese throne
 Take the Azores if possible so as to establish a permanent base.
None of the objectives were achieved. The attempt to restore the Portuguese Crown from Spain was unsuccessful, and the opportunity to strike a decisive blow against the weakened Spanish Navy was lost. The expedition resulted in very heavy losses in English lives and ships, and depleted the financial resources of England's treasury, which had been carefully restored during the long reign of Elizabeth I, Its failure was so embarrassing that, even today, England barely acknowledges it ever happened. Through this lost opportunity, Philip was able revive his navy the very next year, sending 37 ships with 6,420 men to Brittany where they established a base of operations on the Blavet river. The English and Dutch ultimately failed to disrupt the various fleets of the Indies despite the great number of military personnel mobilized every year. Thus, Spain remained the predominant power in Europe for several decades.

List of Squadron Commanders
 Sir Francis Drake, commander of the Squadron of the Revenge and admiral of the fleet
 Sir John Norris, commander of the Squadron of the Nonpareil and general of the army
 Thomas Fenner, vice-admiral and commander of the Squadron of the Dreadnought
 Edward Norris, John's brother, commander of the Squadron of the Foresight
 Roger Williams, commander of the Squadron of the Swiftsure

Composition of the fleet
As recorded on the list of April 8 1589 o.s., there were Royal galleons, English armed merchantmen, Dutch flyboats, pinnaces and other ships for a total of 180 vessels broken down thusly:

The list of April 9 o.s. names 84 ships divided amongst five squadrons each with "near about 15 flyboats", which would give a total of about 160. However, in the payment list of September 5, 1589 o.s. naming 102 ships that returned, there are 33 ships named that were not on the April 9 o.s. list. Those 33 ships were not flyboats hence they should be added to the 160 from the April 9 o.s. list. With expectations of sizable profit and this expedition being mostly commercial, and last minute additions being made up until the fleet sailed on April 28, one cannot really give a precise total number of ships but at least 193 can be documented. Nevertheless, what is rather telling is a February 15, 1591 o.s. notice to the Lord High Treasurer of England, Burghley, wherein the number of vessels was "180 and other ships". It's not outside the realm of possibility that the number "reached nearly two hundred sail." Furthermore, of the 84 ships on the April 9 o.s. list that set sail, only 69 appear on the September 5 o.s. list, thus, according to Wernham, 17 ships were lost. But the number of those not listed and failed to return is unknown. In addition to the 69 that are known to have sailed and returned, another 33 returned with them; most of them medium sized. Considering the number of boats that sailed, many of them small, it must be the case that the losses among these small boats was extremely high. So, without any more precise information, a figure of 70-90 ships lost does not seem exaggerated.

In the April 8 o.s. list, there were two different figures recorded for the number of men participating in the expedition. The first, 23,375, is what most historians and authors have used however at the end of this document, the total number of men had increased to 27,667. A critical analysis of the document reveals the figure of 23,375 is illusory, especially when below the signatures of Drake and Norris, and the confirmation of the Lord High Treasurer Burghley, there's the following postscript:
 Signed J. Norris, F. Drake. Endorsed by Burghley as 8 April 1589. The numbers of men for the army and of ships and of foot at end in his hand 27,667.
The September 5 o.s. payment list goes on to state that 3,722 men survived of which 1,042 received some pay.

Ships of the Squadrons
The fleet was divided into five squadrons as listed below. Each squadron included fifteen (15) flyboats which were not named in any of the known lists.

Squadron of The Revenge
The "first" squadron consisting of seventeen named ships and fifteen flyboats lead by admiral Francis Drake on the flagship Revenge.

Squadron of the Nonpareil
Seventeen ships and fifteen flyboats lead by general of the army John Norris.

Squadron of the Dreadnought
Seventeen ships and fifteen flyboats lead by captain Thomas Fenner, vice-admiral.

Squadron of the Swiftsure
Sixteen ships and fifteen flyboats lead by captain Roger Williams.

Squadron of the Foresight
Seventeen ships and fifteen flyboats lead by captain Edward Norris.

Additional ships
These ships were named on the Sep. 5 o.s. list but not on the April 9 o.s. list.
William Fenner was in command of the HMS Aid but didn't lead a squadron.

See also
 List of shipwrecks in the 16th century
 Brittany Campaign

Notes

References

Bibliography
 
 
 

Conflicts in 1589
Naval battles of the Anglo-Spanish War (1585–1604)
1589 in Europe
1589 in England
Tudor England
History of the Royal Navy
Maritime history of England
Invasions of Spain
Military history of Spain
1589 in the Spanish Empire
Invasions by England